Jean-Lin Lacapelle (born 17 April 1967) is a French politician. He is Member of the European Parliament since 1 February 2020.

Biography 

He was in 23rd position on the list of the National Rally for the 2019 European elections. On February 1, 2020, Lacapelle became Member of the European Parliament as part of 23 new deputies that joined after the United Kingdom left the European Union as part of the Brexit. He declared that the Europarliament did everything to prevent Britain from leaving, but that the time for them to depart had come and that finally the people's choice was respected.

References 

1967 births
Living people
National Rally (France) politicians
National Rally (France) MEPs
MEPs for France 2019–2024
Politicians from Lyon